Sachith (Sinhala: සචිත්) is a Sinhalese masculine given name that may refer to the following notable people:
Sachith Aloka, Sri Lankan football forward
Sachith Dhananjaya (born 1992), Chief Executive Officer (CEO) & Founder at Crynet Solutions
Sachith Dias (born 1984), Sri Lankan cricketer
Sachith Pathirana (born 1989), Sri Lankan cricketer
Sachith Peiris (born 1986), Sri Lankan music director, playback singer and a video director
Sachith Shiromal Wattage (born 1993), Lassana.com Warehouse Manager

Sinhalese masculine given names